Tidal race or tidal rapid is a natural occurrence whereby a fast-moving tide passes through a constriction, resulting in the formation of waves, eddies and hazardous currents. The constriction can be a passage where the sides narrow, for example the Gulf of Corryvreckan and the Saltstraumen maelstrom, or an underwater obstruction (a reef or rising seabed), such as is found at the Portland Race in the United Kingdom.

In extreme cases, such as Skookumchuck Narrows in British Columbia, through which tides can travel at more than 17 knots, very large whirlpools develop, which can be extremely hazardous to navigation.

Notable tidal races
 Cape Reinga in New Zealand
 Skookumchuck Narrows in British Columbia, Canada
 The Bitches in Wales, United Kingdom
 Falls of Lora in Scotland, United Kingdom
 Portland Bill on the Isle of Portland, United Kingdom
 The Alderney Race (12 knots+) on Alderney
 Horizontal Falls in Western Australia, Australia
 Naruto Strait between Shikoku and Awaji Islands, Japan
 Reversing Falls in Saint John, New Brunswick, Canada

See also

Sources

Tides
Whirlpools